Giovanni Rosati (born June 24, 1952) is an Italian former professional footballer who played as a midfielder.

He made 98 appearances in the Italian professional leagues, including 3 in Serie A in his debut 1971–72 season for A.S. Roma.

References

1952 births
Living people
Footballers from Rome
Italian footballers
Association football midfielders
Serie A players
A.S. Roma players
Rimini F.C. 1912 players